Sárpilis is a șarpilii village in Tolna county, Hungary.

References

Populated places in Tolna County